SS Arcata, was built in 1919 as the SS Glymont for the United States Shipping Board as a merchant ship by the Albina Engine & Machine Works in Portland, Oregon. The 2,722-ton cargo ship Glymont was operated by the Matson Navigation till 1923 in post World War I work. In 1923 she was sold to Cook C. W. of San Francisco. In 1925 she was sold to Nelson Charles Company of San Francisco. In 1937 she was sold to Hammond Lumber Company of Fairhaven, California. For World War II, in 1941, she was converted to a US Army Troopship, USAT Arcata. She took supplies and troops to Guam. On July 14, 1942, she was attacked by Japanese submarine I-7 and sank. She was returning after taking supplies to Army troops fighting in the Aleutian Islands campaign.

SS Glymont
Glymont was an Emergency Fleet Corporation design 1049 cargo ship, delivered in May 1919 to the United States Shipping Board. Her hull number was 14 and United States Shipping Board #1691, her official ship number was 217972. In the 1920 and 1930 as the SS Glymont, traveled to ports in China, Hawaii, San Pedro, Seattle, Vancouver Hong Kong, Ichang Chungking Tientsin Manila Kobe and Singapore. In 1921 she was sold to the Robert Dollar Company and used on the same routes.

Construction 
Glymont was built in 1919 by Albina Engine & Machine Works, Portland, Oregon. The designation Emergency Fleet Corporation (EFC) Design 1049 "Albinia Type" ship was applied to an existing Albina design after the United States Shipping Board (USSB) requisitioned the ships. The hull was Albina's yard hull number 14, USSB/EFC hull number 1691.

The ship was oil fired with triple expansion steam engines.

Sinking

On July 14, 1942, the USAT Arcata was attacked with the deck gun and machine guns of Japanese Submarine I-7. The Arcata was not carrying any troops when attacked. She had a crew of 29 and four passengers. The four passengers were three US Navy personnel and one civilian. When attacked she was traveling from Bethel, Alaska to Seattle, Washington. She was south of Alaska's Kamchatka peninsula. One of the submarine's deck gun shells hit the bridge and killed one sailor. The captain gave the abandon ship order, the ship was unarmed. The crew and passengers loaded into lifeboats. The submarine machine gunned the lifeboats, injuring more crew. The lifeboat drifted in the Bering Sea. Some of the crew die of exposure and hypothermia. The USS Kane (DD-235) found the one of the lifeboat and rescued 11 survivors of the SS Arcata. An Alaskan fishing boat Yukon found and picked up the other lifeboat with 14 survivors. In the end eight deid, 2 crew killed from the attack, six 6 from exposure and four passengers survived.

References 

1919 ships
Ships built in Portland, Oregon
World War II auxiliary ships of the United States
Design 1049 ships
Maritime incidents in July 1942